Clancy Jayne is a former member of the Arizona House of Representatives from January 2003 until January 2005. He was elected to the House in November 2002, representing the newly aligned District 6, after redistricting. In 2004, Jayne ran for re-election, but lost in the Republican primary to Pamela Gorman.

References

Republican Party members of the Arizona House of Representatives
Year of birth missing (living people)
Living people
21st-century American politicians